The Laser 50 is an educational portable computer that ran the BASIC programming language released in 1984.

Specifications 
The Laser 50 used a Zilog Z80 central processing unit running at 3.5 MHz, 2 kB to 18 kB of RAM, a 12 kB ROM, and a 80x7 dots LCD screen.

Microcomputers